The Arkansas Circuit Courts are the state trial courts of general jurisdiction of the state of Arkansas.

Composition
There are 23 numbered judicial circuits; however, five circuits are split, resulting in 28 judicial circuits. Each has five divisions: criminal, civil, probate, domestic relations, and juvenile. Each circuit covers at least one of Arkansas's 75 counties.

All judges in Arkansas are elected in non-partisan elections. Circuit judges serve six-year terms and must be attorneys licensed to practice law in Arkansas for six years before they assume office.

List of circuits

References

External links
 David O. Bowden, Encyclopedia of Arkansas History & Culture, State Judiciary (updated Jan. 13, 2017), "Types of Courts" and "Current Organization."

Arkansas state courts
Arkansas